La Verdadera Maquina is the second studio album by WY Records artist Franco "El Gorila" released on November 15, 2011. It featured collaborations with top reggaeton stars such as Cosculluela, Wisin & Yandel, Jowell & Randy & Arcángel.

Track listing

Digital download bonus tracks

Charts

References

Reggaeton albums
2011 albums
WY Records albums